The 1915–16 season was Manchester City F.C.'s twenty-fifth season of league football.

With the start of the First World War, all Football League football was cancelled. In its place were formed War Leagues, based on geographical lines rather than based on previous league placement. Manchester City contested the Lancashire Section in the Principal Tournament, and the Southern Division of the Lancashire Section in the Subsidiary Tournament. However, none of these were considered to be competitive football, and thus their records are not recognised by the Football League.

Team Kit

War Leagues

Principal Tournament

Lancashire Section

Results summary

N.B. Points awarded for a win: 2

Reports

Subsidiary Tournament

Lancashire Section, Southern Division

Results summary

N.B. Points awarded for a win: 2

Reports

Squad statistics

Squad
Appearances for competitive matches only

Scorers

All

Principal Tournament

Subsidiary Tournament

See also
Manchester City F.C. seasons

References

External links
Extensive Manchester City statistics site

Manchester City F.C. seasons
Manchester City F.C.